Take Me Back to Oklahoma is a 1940 American Western film directed by Albert Herman and starring Tex Ritter, Karl Hackett and Bob Wills.

Plot

Cast

Soundtrack
 "Village Blacksmith" (by Lew Porter and Johnny Lange)
 "Kalamity Kate" (by Lew Porter and Johnny Lange)
 "You Are My Sunshine" (by Jimmie Davis with Charles Mitchell's Orchestra)
 "Good Old Oklahoma" (by Bob Wills)
 "Take Me Back To Tulsa" (by Bob Wills)
 "Going Indian" (by Bob Wills)
 "Lone Star Rag" (by Bob Wills)
 "Bob Wills Special" (by Bob Wills)

External links

1940 films
American black-and-white films
1940 Western (genre) films
Monogram Pictures films
American Western (genre) films
Films directed by Albert Herman
1940s English-language films
1940s American films